Silversun is an Australian TV series.

Silversun or Silver Sun may also refer to:

Silver Sun, an English rock/pop band
Silver Sun (Silver Sun album), 1997
Silver Sun (Nothing's Carved in Stone album), 2012

See also
Silversun Pickups, an American indie rock band